Mario Ortiz Ruiz (born 24 March 1989 in Santander, Cantabria) is a Spanish professional footballer who plays for Pontevedra CF as a midfielder.

Honours
Albacete
Segunda División B: 2013–14

Cultural Leonesa
Segunda División B: 2016–17

References

External links

1989 births
Living people
Spanish footballers
Footballers from Santander, Spain
Association football midfielders
La Liga players
Segunda División players
Segunda División B players
Primera Federación players
Segunda Federación players
Rayo Cantabria players
Racing de Santander players
CD Castellón footballers
UB Conquense footballers
CD Puertollano footballers
RCD Espanyol B footballers
Albacete Balompié players
Cultural Leonesa footballers
CF Reus Deportiu players
Córdoba CF players
Hércules CF players
Pontevedra CF footballers